Atherton High School (formerly Atherton Community School & Hesketh Fletcher CofE High School) is a mixed Secondary school and sixth form located in Atherton in the Metropolitan Borough of Wigan, Greater Manchester, England. It is formally designated as a Christian faith school. The school opened in 2012 for 11-year-old (Year 7) pupils, but expanded over the next few years to become a full secondary school. The school's sixth form opened in 2013.

The school was the first free school to open in Greater Manchester, and was established after the Chapel Street and Atherton Community Consortium had campaigned for the opening of a new secondary school in the Atherton area. In 2020 the school was transferred to the Education Partnership Trust and was renamed Atherton High School.

Admissions
Where admissions are oversubscribed, priority is given to children living closest to the school.

References

External links
 Atherton High School official website

Free schools in England
Free Schools in England with a Formal Faith Designation
Educational institutions established in 2012
Secondary schools in the Metropolitan Borough of Wigan
2012 establishments in England
Atherton, Greater Manchester